Pedro Osores de Ulloa (Saa, Vigo, 1554 – Concepcion, Chile, September 18, 1624) was Royal Governor of Chile from November 1621 to September 1624. He replaced Cristóbal de la Cerda y Sotomayor.  On his death bed Osores appointed his brother-in-law Francisco de Álava y Nureña as temporary governor in September 1624. Was a knight of the Order of Alcántara

Sources

1554 births
1624 deaths
Royal Governors of Chile
Spanish generals
Spanish military personnel
Knights of the Order of Alcántara
People from Vigo